Nanomelon is a genus of sea snails, marine gastropod mollusks in the family Volutidae.

Species
Species within the genus Nanomelon include:

 Nanomelon viperinus Leal & Bouchet, 1989
 Nanomelon vossi Leal & Rios, 1990

References

Volutidae